March 12 - Eastern Orthodox liturgical calendar - March 14

All fixed commemorations below are observed on March 26 by Eastern Orthodox Churches on the Old Calendar.

For March 13th, Orthodox Churches on the Old Calendar commemorate the Saints listed on February 28 (February 29 on leap years).

Saints

 Hieromartyr Publius, Bishop of Malta and later Bishop of Athens (2nd century)   (see also: January 21 - West)
 Martyrs Alexander, Dionysius and Frontonus, the "Basilikoi" (the Emperor's men), in Thessaloniki (c. 305)  (see also: March 14)
 Martyr Christina of Persia, scourged to death (4th century)
 Venerable Euphrasia, in the Thebaid (Thebais). (see also: July 25)
 Martyr Abibus (Sabinus), at Hermopolis in Egypt, tied with stones and drowned in a river.
 Saint Marios (Marius), Bishop of Sebasteia.
 Venerable martyr Theoktistos, of the Great Lavra of St. Sabbas the Sanctified, reposed in peace (797)

Pre-Schism Western saints

 Martyrs Africanus, Publius, and Terence, at Carthage (250)
 Saint Leander of Seville, Bishop of Seville (596)
 Martyr Ramirus and Companions, at the monastery of St Claudio in Leon in Spain (c. 554 or 630)
 Saint Mochoemoc (Mochaemhog, Pulcherius, Vulcanius), monk at Bangor in Co. Down under St Comgall, later founded Liath-Mochoemoc (c. 656)
 Saint Kevoca (Kennotha, Quivoca), a saint honoured in Kyle in Scotland (7th century)
 Saint Gerald of Mayo, followed St Colman from Lindisfarne to Ireland and became his successor in the English monastery in Mayo (732)
 Saint Ansovinus, Bishop of Camerino (840)
 Saint Heldrad (Eldrad, Eldradus), abbot at Novalesa Abbey for thirty years (842)
 Martyrs Rudericus (Roderick) and Salomon (Solomon), in Córdoba in Spain (857)

Post-Schism Orthodox saints

New martyrs and confessors

 New Hieromartyr Nicholas Popov, Priest (1919)
 New Hieromartyr Gregory Pospelov, Archpriest, of Kronstadt (1921)
 New Hieromartyr Stephen (Bekh), Bishop of Izhevsk (1933)
 New Hieromartyr Michael Okolovich, Archpriest, of Irkutsk (1938)

Other commemorations

 Translation of the relics (846) of St. Nicephorus the Confessor, Patriarch of Constantinople (829)
 Repose of Elder Ephraim of Valaam Monastery (1946)
 Repose of Bishop Tikhon (Tikhomirov) of Kyrillov (1955)

Icon gallery

Notes

References

Sources
 March 13/March 26. Orthodox Calendar (PRAVOSLAVIE.RU).
 March 26 / March 13. HOLY TRINITY RUSSIAN ORTHODOX CHURCH (A parish of the Patriarchate of Moscow).
 March 13. OCA - The Lives of the Saints.
 The Autonomous Orthodox Metropolia of Western Europe and the Americas (ROCOR). St. Hilarion Calendar of Saints for the year of our Lord 2004. St. Hilarion Press (Austin, TX). p.21.
 March 13. Latin Saints of the Orthodox Patriarchate of Rome.
 The Roman Martyrology. Transl. by the Archbishop of Baltimore. Last Edition, According to the Copy Printed at Rome in 1914. Revised Edition, with the Imprimatur of His Eminence Cardinal Gibbons. Baltimore: John Murphy Company, 1916. pp.74-75.
Greek Sources
 Great Synaxaristes:  13 ΜΑΡΤΙΟΥ. ΜΕΓΑΣ ΣΥΝΑΞΑΡΙΣΤΗΣ.
  Συναξαριστής. 13 Μαρτίου. ECCLESIA.GR. (H ΕΚΚΛΗΣΙΑ ΤΗΣ ΕΛΛΑΔΟΣ).
Russian Sources
  26 марта (13 марта). Православная Энциклопедия под редакцией Патриарха Московского и всея Руси Кирилла (электронная версия). (Orthodox Encyclopedia - Pravenc.ru).
  13 марта (ст.ст.) 26 марта 2013 (нов. ст.). Русская Православная Церковь Отдел внешних церковных связей. (DECR).

March in the Eastern Orthodox calendar